Edgewater Borough Hall is located in Edgewater, Bergen County, New Jersey, United States. The building was added to the National Register of Historic Places on January 16, 2008. The building was constructed in 1904.

See also
National Register of Historic Places listings in Bergen County, New Jersey

References

Edgewater, New Jersey
Buildings and structures in Bergen County, New Jersey
Government buildings completed in 1904
City and town halls in New Jersey
National Register of Historic Places in Bergen County, New Jersey
New Jersey Register of Historic Places
City and town halls on the National Register of Historic Places in New Jersey